The Ventspils District was an administrative division of Latvia, located in the Courland region, in the country's west.

The district consisted of eleven parishes and one rural territory.

Districts were eliminated during the administrative-territorial reform in 2009.

Parishes and rural territory

Ance
Jūrkalne
Pope
Puze
Targale
Ugale
Usma
Uzava
Varve
Ziras
Zlekas 
Piltene town's rural territory.

Districts of Latvia